Favartia (Favartia) levicula is a species of sea snail, a marine gastropod mollusc in the family Muricidae, the murex snails or rock snails.

Description
The shell grows to a length of 18 mm

Distribution
This species is distributed in the Gulf of Mexico, the Caribbean Sea and in the Atlantic Ocean from North Carolina to Florida.

References

 Rosenberg, G., F. Moretzsohn, and E. F. García. 2009. Gastropoda (Mollusca) of the Gulf of Mexico, pp. 579–699 in Felder, D.L. and D.K. Camp (eds.), Gulf of Mexico–Origins, Waters, and Biota. Biodiversity. Texas A&M Press, College Station, Texas

External links
 

Muricidae
Gastropods described in 1889